Allan Hutton (27 August 1908 – 23 September 1939) was an Australian rules footballer who played for the St Kilda Football Club in the Victorian Football League (VFL). Hutton died at the age of 31, from injuries sustained when he was struck by a motor bus while riding a bicycle in Yallourn.

Notes

External links 

1908 births
1939 deaths
Australian rules footballers from Victoria (Australia)
St Kilda Football Club players
Road incident deaths in Victoria (Australia)
Cycling road incident deaths